The Technical University Ingolstadt of Applied Sciences (Technische Hochschule Ingolstadt (THI)) is a German public research-oriented university of applied sciences (Hochschule für angewandte Wissenschaften) located in Ingolstadt. Founded in 1994, it currently has around 6,500 students in five faculties and offers more than 80 courses of study. The central focus of research and teaching are in technology and business. The main campus is located in the center of Ingolstadt. The second campus is located in Neuburg an der Donau.

History 

After its foundation in 1994, the Technische Hochschule Ingolstadt starts teaching at the Hohe Schule in the old town of Ingolstadt. The first course of study in business administration starts with 90 students and three professors. The founding president is Hartmut Sax.

In 1999 the university moved into its new building at the Esplanade. The number of students rose to 700 and the range of courses now includes five diploma degree programs. Gunter Schweiger becomes the second president. In 2004, an amendment to the Bavarian Higher Education Act makes research a core task of universities of applied sciences alongside teaching. Therefore, the Institut für Angewandte Forschung (Institute for Applied Research, IAF) is founded at the Technische Hochschule Ingolstadt.

In 2008, the Institut für Akademische Weiterbildung (Institute for Academic Continuing Education, IAW) is founded as Bavaria's first faculty for further education. From this point on, the university has three operating areas: teaching, research and further education. The university's study center in the historic old town of Neuburg a.d. Donau is established in 2009. In 2012, Walter Schober follows Gunter Schweiger as president. In 2015, the campus expansion buildings are inaugurated. The THI campus is thus expanded by an additional 9,200 square meters and almost doubles in size. Then, in 2016, the CARISSMA (Center of Automotive Research on Integrated Safety Systems and Measurement Area) research and test center is inaugurated. It is designed to be a nationwide scientific centre for vehicle safety and is the first research facility at a university of applied sciences in Germany. Also, a research branch of the Instituts für neue Energie-Systeme (Institute for New Energy Systems, InES) and a branch of the Graduate Centre are established in the Neuburg Study Centre.

2017 is the inauguration of Villa Heydeck: The former director's villa in the north of the foundry grounds becomes an official THI building. The Audi Confucius Institute Ingolstadt (AKII), a non-profit institution for the promotion of knowledge of the Chinese language and culture, is founded. In addition to strengthening intercultural understanding, AKII`s purpose is to promote German-Chinese cooperation in the fields of technology, innovation, sustainability and management. These specializations are unique among Confucius Institutes worldwide. As part of the "FH Impuls" initiative of the Federal Ministry of Education and Research, THI will receive almost 6 million euros over a period of four years for the strategic partnership SAFIR (Safety for all - Innovative Research Partnership on Global Vehicle and Road Safety Systems).

In 2018, the THI and the Catholic University of Eichstätt-Ingolstadt (KU) launch the joint project "Mensch in Bewegung", which aims at increasing the transfer of technology and knowledge to the region. As part of the federal funding initiative “Innovative Hochschule” ("Innovative University"), the THI and the KU will receive 15 million euros over a period of five years. Also, the Bavarian Council of Ministers decides to expand the THI by 2,500 students in Ingolstadt and by 1,200 students on a new campus in Neuburg a. d. Donau. At the Ingolstadt campus, the new study field of Health and Life Sciences will be established in the winter semester 2020/21. A new campus will be built in Neuburg a. d. Donau with the study field Construction/Energy/Environment. The Ingolstadt Research Centre for Artificial Intelligence and Machine Learning (AININ - Artificial Intelligence Network Ingolstadt), which is based at the THI, is founded in 2019. Also in this year, starting from the winter semester 2019/20, the THI's three faculties were expanded and split into five faculties of Electrical Engineering and Information Technology, Computer Science, Mechanical Engineering, Engineering and Management, and the THI Business School. Another thing that happened in 2019 is that in his governmental declaration, Bavarian Minister-President Markus Söder announced that the THI is to become a mobility node in the Bavaria-wide AI network as part of the High-Tech Agenda. The THI is the only university of applied sciences where such a node is located.

In 2020, The Bavarian Center for Applied Research and Technology with Latin America (AWARE) is founded at the THI in January. In March 2020, the Fraunhofer-Anwendungszentrum für Vernetzte Mobilität und Infrastruktur (Fraunhofer Application Center for Integrated Mobility and Infrastructure) opens at the THI.

On 4 October 2021, the THI opened its external location in Neuburg an der Donau. Around 100 students began studying in the degree programmes "Sustainability and Environmental Management" and "Industrial Engineering and Construction".

On 31 January 2022, the opening of Bavaria's first modular building of the Hightech Agenda Bayern at the Ingolstadt Campus with an integrated Entrepreneurship Lab was held by Minister President Markus Söder and Minister of Science Bernd Sibler.

In May 2022, the Research and Transfer Centre Sustainability Neuburg (ForTraNN) was opened at the Neuburg Campus as part of the scientific conference "The Great Transformation", which is to deal with interdisciplinary sustainability research and transfer. In 2022, the Bavarian Foresight Institute is to be founded, which will be dedicated to technology-oriented future research.

Campus 

The Ingolstadt campus is located directly next to the historic old town. The Neues Schloss and Ludwigstraße, the city's main shopping street, are in the immediate vicinity.

The campus on the Esplanade covers an area of 60,000 square meters. Among other things, it accommodates the publicly accessible library of the THI, 80 lecture halls, project and seminar rooms, 18 large laboratories as well as 80 regular laboratories, PC pools and workshops.

A new campus is being built at the Neuburg a. d. Donau location with the field of study Construction / Energy / Environment.

Academics and teaching 

The THI offers more than 80 courses of study in the five faculties of Electrical Engineering and Information Technology, Computer Science, Mechanical Engineering, Engineering and Management and at the THI Business School. The foundation of a further faculty "Sustainable Infrastructure" based in Neuburg a. d. Donau is in preparation.

Dual studies are possible at the THI in the undergraduate Bachelor's as well as in the Master programme. There are two modes of study: joint studies and studies with in-depth practical experience. In joint studies, the course is combined with vocational training (IHK/HWK degree). Studies with in-depth practical experience combine studying at the THI with periods of practical experience in a company without completion of a vocational training.

THI sees itself as an international university and, as of 2022, it cooperates with about 150 partner universities worldwide.

The university offers a two-year support programme called "THI Talent" for exceptionally talented and committed students.

The Center of Entrepreneurship (CoE) at THI coordinates all start-up activities at the university. The Center's main task is to support competitive start-ups at the THI and to ensure the transfer of knowledge between research and practice. The university aims at promoting start-ups on its campus as well as in the region.

Basic bachelor's degree programmes 
The THI offers the following Bachelor's degree programmes. All courses of study can also be studied in a dual system.

Regular master's degree programmes 
The THI offers the following Master's programmes.

All courses, with the exception of the Master's degree course "Applied Research in Engineering Sciences", can also be studied in a dual system.

Further education programmes 

The Institut für Akademische Weiterbildung (Institute for Academic Continuing Education, IAW) brings together all continuing education and advanced learning activities of the Technische Hochschule Ingolstadt. The IAW has been system certified as a sub-unit of the THI since December 2015. The institute offers part-time Bachelor, Master and MBA programmes, university certificates and customized programmes for companies. The IAW is also home to the Integration Campus (INCA). This prepares refugees with university entrance qualifications for academic studies and the job market in Germany.

Student life 

There are a number of student clubs at the THI, including:
 Schanzer Racing Electric e. V., a racing team that builds electric racing cars and races internationally
 Students' Life, an association that organizes events for students
 Consult.IN e. V., a student consulting agency
 Eta-nol e. V., an association that develops a hybrid vehicle powered by ethanol and participates in races
 Our Future e. V., a non-profit association that is committed to sustainability
 Neuland Ingolstadt e.V., ein Informatik-Verein
 NEWEXIST, a start-up initiative
 N.I.C.E (Network and International Culture Exchange), a network that supports foreign students at the university
 Mabuhay Philippines Förderverein e. V., an association that initiates donation projects for the underprivileged in the Philippines
 Student Stock Exchange Club Ingolstadt e. V.
 Think - The student newspaper
 UNICEF University Group
 Catholic University Parish

There is also a wide range of sporting events for university students and staff.

Research and transfer 

Technische Hochschule Ingolstadt is one of the strongest research universities in the field of applied science universities in Germany. The university has a research volume of around 22 million euros per year. This volume corresponds to about one third of the university's budget and has almost tripled in the last four years, as of 2020.

Research at THI is organised in seven internal research institutes - CARISSMA (C-IAD, C-ISAFE, C-ECOS), AImotion Bavaria, Institute for Innovative Mobility (IIMo) Institute for New Energy Systems (InES) and Research and Transfer Centre Sustainability Neuburg (ForTraNN). In addition, the university works closely with the three affiliated institutes AININ, Fraunhofer Anwendungszentrum and INAS.

The three research institutes CARISSMA, the Institute for Innovative Mobility and the Institute for New Energy Systems are features in the HRK Research Map, which presents key research priorities of German universities.

AI Mobility Node and Artificial Intelligence Network Ingolstadt (AININ) 

Thematic cluster in the AI mobility node Technische Hochschule Ingolstadt was named a mobility node in the Bavarian network for artificial intelligence in October 2019 in a government declaration by Bavarian Minister-President Markus Söder. The other nodes, Data Science, Health and Intelligent Robotics, are located in Munich, Würzburg and Erlangen at the local universities.

As a node, THI is responsible for coordinating research on AI mobility in Bavaria and receives additional funds for personnel and AI mobility research. The THI focuses on the topics of autonomous driving, unmanned flight and automobile production.

The activities of the AI mobility node are pooled in the Research Centre for Artificial Intelligence and Machine Learning AININ (Artificial Intelligence Network Ingolstadt), which was founded at THI in April 2019. In addition to mobility, AININ is also researching the application of AI in the areas of trade, health and production.

AININ brings together seven partners from science, business and society: The Technische Hochschule Ingolstadt, the Catholic University of Eichstätt-Ingolstadt, the Fraunhofer-Gesellschaft, the city of Ingolstadt, the Klinikum Ingolstadt, AUDI AG and the MediaMarktSaturn Retail Group. The different perspectives from science, business and society are designed to promote interdisciplinary approaches and ensure that AI solutions from one subject area can be quickly transferred to other areas. The aim is to transform research results into socially relevant products and production methods and into new companies.

CARISSMA Research and Testing Center 

The THI is home to CARISSMA (Center of Automotive Research on Integrated Safety Systems and Measurement Area), Germany's first research facility at a university of applied sciences. The more than 120-metre-long building has been in use since 2016 and accommodates a total of ten testing facilities, including an indoor testing facility for collision tests and technical trials, a drop tower, a laboratory for Car2X-communication and a virtual simulation laboratory. There is also an outdoor testing area for complete vehicle testing as well as a driving simulator with a Hexapod motion platform and a pedestrian safety laboratory. CARISSMA researches for Vision Zero, the European Union's vision of zero road fatalities, in the fields of passive safety, integrated safety, testing systems and safe electric mobility. Through the close networking and integration of different fields of technology, CARISSMA is intended to provide a global safety system in the future.

Institute of Innovative Mobility 
In the Institut für Innovative Mobilität (Institute for Innovative Mobility, IIMo), propulsion systems and energy consumption of road vehicles are optimized in terms of energy efficiency and customer benefit. The research areas of the IIMo are electrical mobility and adaptive systems, interconnection technologies, power electronics and motor and drive train. In addition to innovative functionality developments and operating strategies, the topics of networked mobility, Industry 4.0 and Smart City are increasingly being incorporated into the projects.

Institute for New Energy Systems (InES) 
Since 2000, THI's research activities on renewable energies have been bundled at the Institut für neue Energie-Systeme (Institute for New Energy Systems, InES).

The application-oriented research at InES is mainly carried out in cooperation with medium-sized industrial partners as well as research institutes and partner universities. Furthermore, InES is active in several national and international research associations. Scientists of the institute are represented in a variety of national and international committees and advisory boards.

Fraunhofer Application Center for Integrated Mobility and Infrastructure 
The Fraunhofer-Anwendungszentrum für Vernetzte Mobilität und Infrastruktur  (Fraunhofer Application Center for Integrated Mobility and Infrastructure), which opened in March 2020 and is based at the THI. It conducts research on sensor technology, communication (vehicle-to-x communication) and artificial intelligence in the fields of highly-automated driving, integrated traffic systems, traffic safety, efficient use of energy resources, and utilization of existing traffic infrastructures. The Ingolstadt Fraunhofer Application Center is closely linked to the Fraunhofer research landscape in Bavaria. The Fraunhofer Application Center is affiliated technically with the Fraunhofer-Anwendungszentrum an das Fraunhofer Institut für Verkehrs- und Infrastruktursysteme IVI (Fraunhofer Institute for Transportation and Infrastructure Systems IVI) in Dresden.

Institute for Applied Sustainability (inas) 
Since June 2019, the Institut für angewandte Nachhaltigkeit (Institute for Applied Sustainability, inas) has been an affiliated institute of the THI and the Catholic University of Eichstätt-Ingolstadt. The institute's goal is to promote research and teaching for sustainable development in the Region 10 and to encourage people to adopt sustainable living models. The inas was founded in 2017 on the initiative of THI Honorary Professor Reinhard Büchl.

Graduate Center 
The Graduate Centre was established in 2013 with the aim of promoting and networking young scientists and scholars, as well as ensuring and developing quality standards for the doctorate programme. The Graduate Centre enables a cooperative doctorate at the THI with a university in Germany or abroad. The THI is also integrated into the Bavarian Science Forum BayWISS, through which cooperative doctoral studies with other Bavarian universities are possible. In BayWISS, the THI coordinates the "Mobility and Transport" collaborative college together with the Technical University of Munich.

References

External links
 

Ingolstadt
1994 establishments in Germany
Educational institutions established in 1994
Universities of Applied Sciences in Germany
Buildings and structures in Ingolstadt